Durga Charan Nag better known as Nag Mahasaya (Maha Asayah in Sanskrit or "of great possession"), was born in 1846 in the village of Deobhog (Narayanganj district) in East Bengal, now Bangladesh. He was one of the householder disciples of Sri Ramakrishna Paramahansa. Sri Ramakrishna called him "a blazing fire" when he first saw him.  According to the other disciples of Sri Ramakrishna, most notable among them being Swami Vivekananda, he was a shining example of renunciation and love for God. He shunned material wealth and regarded every human being as God on earth. He lived on a meager income, but spent most of it on serving the poor, his guests, and monks and ascetics.

Sarat Chandra Chakravarty, a direct disciple of Swami Vivekananda and the author of the book "Diary of a Disciple" (Swami-Sishya Sangbad in Bengali) wrote the biography on Nag Mahasaya. There is not much literature available on Nag Mahasaya and most of the information on him can be obtained in works related to Sri Ramakrishna, his teacher and master, and Swami Vivekananda, the foremost disciple of Ramakrishna.

Swami Vivekananda mentioned to Sarat Chandra in a conversation about Nag Mahasaya - "All the characteristics of the highest type of devotion, spoken of in the scriptures, have manifested themselves in Nag Mahashaya. It is only in him that we actually see fulfilled the widely quoted text, "Trinadapi Sunichena". ("Lowlier than the lowly stalk of grass.") Blessed indeed is your East Bengal to have been hallowed by the touch of Nag Mahashaya's feet!"
In his hometown in Bangladesh, a foundation runs a charitable institution bearing his name.

Nag died in 1899 in his home of Deobhog.

Biography

Early life
Nag Mahasaya was born in Deobhog village in East Bengal (present Bangladesh) in 1846 to Dindayal Nag and his wife Tripurasundari Devi. Nag mahasaya lost his mother early in his life. Dindayal Nag did not remarry, so the task of bringing up Nag Mahasaya and his younger sister fell upon Bhagavati, the elder sister of Dindayal.

Little is known about Nag Mahasaya's childhood, except that he was sweet tongued, well-behaved and modest. He was serene in appearance. His aunt told him stories of Puranas, Ramayana and Mahabharata which had a deep and lasting influence on his subsequent life. He was always truthful and was pious.

Nag Mahasaya had a deep love for education, but there was no school in his village. He studied for sometimes in a vernacular school in Narayanganj district, but had to leave after third standard, the highest class in that school. His father wanted to send him to Calcutta to study, but could not bear the expense. Nag Mahasaya set off to search for a school in Dacca. He travelled on foot a distance of 10 miles from Narayanganj to reach Dacca and after much effort enrolled himself to the Normal school where he studied for the next 15 months. Later he came to Calcutta to study medical science.

Marriage and Life as a Medical Practitioner
Nag Mahasaya married eleven-year-old Prasanna Kumari in accordance with the customs prevailing at that time in Bengal. 5 months after his marriage, he came to Calcutta to study in Campbell school of medicine, but he could not study for long. After this, he studied Homeopathy under Dr. Behari Lal Bhaduri. At this point, his first wife died of dysentery, and he hardly could have any interaction with her. He treated and distributed medicine to the poor free of cost, having success even while treating very difficult cases.

Nag Mahasaya's life took a new turn when he met Suresh Datta, who belonged to Brahmo sect. Even though they had quite different beliefs, they were friendly with each other. Suresh took him to the Nababidhan Brahmo Samaj founded by Keshab Chandra Sen, the then famous religious leader and orator of Bengal.
About this time he delved deeper into the spiritual practices.

When the news of his spiritual practices reached Dindayal, the concerned father decided to marry his son off as per the prevailing customs in Bengal. According to his biographer Sarat Chandra Chakravarty, about his marriage Nagmahashaya used to say, "Marriage with the pure desire for progeny does not defile a man. But only saints and sages of yore were fit for such marriages. Having observed austere Brahmacharya (celibacy) for a long time, they took wives for the purpose of continuing their progeny; and having begot sons like Vyasa, Sukadeva, Sanaka and Sanatkumara, they retired to the forest to lead the life of a recluse. But it cannot be so in this Iron Age. Nowadays, there is not that deep meditation and self-restraint, and so, the children born of lust become wicked and immoral." About his second marriage, he said, "What could I do? It was my father's command! I had to obey it, although it was venom itself to me."

After the marriage, father and son returned to Calcutta and Nag Mahasaya set up his medical practice. Nag Mahasaya also began to accept fees for the treatment of patients. About this time he lost his aunt. This was the first instance of bereavement in his life. His biography mentions that his disenchantment with the material possessions arose with this incident- "With death all relationships cease, so why should there be all these "I" and "mine"? The world is full of suffering and misery, how can one ever be free from bondage, were the questions that haunted him."

Nag Mahasaya did not ask for any fee in the course of his medical practice, but rather accepted what was given to him out of love and gratitude, so his practice began to increase. He was very simple in his outlook and attire, and he shunned all luxuries. His primary concern was to spend his earnings for the poor. Once when Dindayal, his father, bought him an expensive shawl, he donated it to a poor who was suffering severely because of winter. He even brought poor patients to his own house for better treatment.

When his father became old and infirm he was sent away to stay in his native village and Nag Mahasaya's wife also went with him. Nag Mahasaya stayed back in Calcutta in a small cottage. During this time Suresh, the Brahmo friend, told Nag Mahasaya of a certain saint of Dakshineswar, who was none but Sri Ramakrishna. According to his biography, this was a major turning point in his life.

Meeting with Sri Ramakrishna
The first meeting between Sri Ramakrishna and Nag Mahasaya is well documented in his biography and in several other sources, notably "They Lived with God" by Swami Chetanananda.
Suresh and Nag Mahasaya, went to Sri Ramakrishna's room. Sri Ramakrishna, as mentioned in the biography, enquired about him and in the course of the conversation asked him to live like a pankal fish (a slippery freshwater fish in Bengal). He explained that a pankal fish lives in soil, but is not soiled by it. Similarly, one should try to live in the world without attachment to any material thing, then one would not come to any grief. Sri Ramakrishna had told Suresh that "verily that person (Nag Mahasaya) was a blazing fire". He also told Nag Mahasaya that he had attained a very high spiritual state. 
According to his biography, this meeting left a lasting impression in Nag Mahasaya's mind.

Next time, Nag Mahasaya visited Dakshineswar alone and was treated very kindly by Sri Ramakrishna. According to the biography, Nag Mahasaya was overwhelmed by this visit and remarked about this incident later - "No one can realize Him unless blessed by Him. Even austere penances for a thousand years will be of no avail to realize Him, if He does not show mercy."

Nag Mahasaya also met Narendranath Dutta (Swami Vivekananda) in Dakshineswar and had a discussion with him. He had an extremely high regard for Swami Vivekananda. Sarat Chandra Chakravarty, who was a disciple of Swami Vivekananda, testified that the Swami also had tremendous respect for Nag Mahasaya.

Nag Mahasaya also met the noted Bengali poet and playwright Girish Chandra Ghosh in Dakshineswar, and they were lifelong friends.

Influence of Sri Ramakrishna
Nag Mahasaya got to hear a chance remark of Sri Ramakrishna that it was very difficult for a doctor or a lawyer to realize god. According to his biographer, because of this reason, he threw his box of medicine in the Ganges and gave up his practice. He was later employed by his father's employers, M/s Pals.

He asked Sri Ramakrishna for his permission to renounce worldly life. However, Sri Ramakrishna did not agree to this. According to the biography and other disciples of Ramakrishna who were also familiar with Nag Mahasaya, Sri Ramakrishna asked him to remain as a householder and lead a model life for all the householders.

Conversation with Sri Ramakrishna
A few excerpts are taken from a conversation between Sri Ramakrishna and Nag Mahasaya -

"Noticing Nagmahashaya's strong spirit of renunciation, and his desire to take to monastic life, Sri Ramakrishna told him once again, "Continue to be a householder and remain in your own home. Somehow or other the family will get its bare maintenance, you won't have to worry for it."

Nagmahashaya: How can one remain in the home? How can one remain unmoved even at the sight of others' sufferings and troubles?

Sri Ramakrishna: Well, I tell you, take my word. Nothing can taint you, even if you remain a householder. Men will wonder to see your life.

Nagmahashaya: How should I pass my days as a householder?

Sri Ramakrishna: You have not to do anything; only be always in the company of pious men.

Nagmahashaya: How am I to distinguish a pious man, unintelligent as I am?

Sri Ramakrishna: Oh no, you have not to search for them. You remain in your own house, and the truly pious men will of their own accord come to you."

Devotion towards Sri Ramakrishna
There are many stories around the love and devotion of Nag Mahasaya for Sri Ramakrishna. A few days before the master's death in Cossipore garden house, he by chance heard that Sri Ramakrishna, then terminally ill from throat cancer, had asked for an amalakee (Indian Gooseberry) fruit. He at once set out to fetch it, knowing fully well that it was not the season for that fruit. After a great deal of trouble, he finally got one and brought it for his Master when all others had failed to procure it.

Life as a householder ascetic

Practice of the Ascetic Life
At this point in time, since Nag Mahasaya was not much inclined towards a regular work life and instead preferred to lead the ascetic life, his employers made an arrangement with his associate to work on his behalf but to pay half the profit of the salt despatch business to him.

He would serve all irrespective of caste, creed and class. He would pay whatever prices shopkeepers asked of him and when being repentant some of them later wanted to reimburse him he would not accept it, being concerned about their losses. He never got his house repaired because it would give trouble to another person to undergo so much problem on his behalf. One incident mentions his concern for a labourer whom his wife employed for repairing the roof of his house. He fanned the labourer himself and treated him like an honoured guest in his house.

For the last twenty years of his life, Nag Mahasaya came back and settled in his native place to look after his old father. Even though he was genial and non-violent, Nag Mahasaya could never withstand anybody criticising Sri Ramakrishna.

Relationship with his devotees
According to his biographer, there were many earnest devotees of Nag Mahasaya whom he treated with utmost care and compassion. The biography mentions one particular incident of his devotion towards his guests. He suffered from colic pain, and one day he had a severe attack when he had guests at his home. Even at that state he himself apparently bought all provisions for serving his guests. He always used to keep his guests in his best room, and once he and his wife spent a stormy night sitting and meditating under a porch. His income was meagre, but a substantial portion was spent for welfare and service, leaving very little for himself or his family. He also ran into debt as a result.

Relationship with his wife
Of the devotees of Nagmahashaya, the name of his wife must be mentioned first. According to Sarat Chandra Chakravarty who was very closely associated with the family, she was extremely faithful to her husband's 'eccentric' ways and regarded him as a god. She would be attending to all her household duties, and at the same time she was all attention to her husband and her guests. She would leave her bed before everybody else, and as soon as she finished her morning household duties, she would sit down for worship and meditation. She never took any food before her husband and the guests had finished theirs.

Meeting with Holy Mother, Sri Sarada Devi
He also met Sarada Devi affectionately called Sri Ma or the holy mother by her devotees, who was the wife and spiritual consort of Sri Ramakrishna. 
According to Sarat Chandra Chakravarty, he held tremendous respect for the holy mother. "Mother is more merciful than father", he once told his biographer, who had accompanied him on a journey to visit the holy mother.

Testimonials

Swami Vivekananda held extremely high regards for Nag Mahasaya. An excerpt is taken here from the book "Diary of a Disciple" by Sarat Chandra Chakravarty which illustrates the Swami's views on Nag Mahasaya.
"Swamiji: Shri Ramakrishna used to compare him to King Janaka. A man with such control over all the senses one does not hear of even, much less come across. You must associate with him as much as you can. He is one of Shri Ramakrishna's nearest disciples.

Disciple: Many in our part of the country call him a madcap. But I have known him to be a great soul since the very first day of my meeting him. He loves me much, and I have his fervent blessings.

According to the biography, the brother monks of Belur Math also loved him dearly. On one occasion when Nag Mahasaya went to the Alambazar Math at noon time when the shrine to the master was closed after the midday meal, one of his brother disciples Swami Ramakrishnananda who was very strict in observing rules regarding service to the Master, himself broke the rules for Nag Mahasaya. The shrine was opened in that unusual hour to offer food to the Master before serving Nag Mahasaya as the latter would accept only Prasad or the holy food pertaken by the Master. Nag Mahashaya also had the highest reverence for his Sannyasin brother disciples. He used to say of them, "They are not men but gods in human forms who came to play with the Lord. Who can know them? Who can understand them?"

Girish Chandra Ghosh, the noted playwright of Bengal and a friend of Nag Mahasaya said that by constantly beating his ego Nag Mahasaya crushed it completely, so that it could never raise its head. It is mentioned in his biography and several other sources of literature dealing with the disciples of Sri Ramakrishna that he was humility personified.

Legacy

Compassion and Kindness 
There are many incidents in his biography narrating his kindness and compassion for others. During the plague epidemic in Calcutta which took place in 1898, Nag Mahasaya nursed his own cook who fell ill and then carried him to the Ganges alone as per the last wish of the man even at the risk of his own life. He had once been paid an amount for his return journey in a steamer when he went for seeing a patient. On his way back he saw a beggar woman in a most pitiable condition and gave away the entire amount to her and walked barefoot all the way back to Calcutta. On another occasion after a hard day's work he earned some money which he instantly gave away to another man in misery when he heard his sob story and himself went without food. He would often say, "Abstinence from lust and greed brings a man near to God."

He also had the same compassion for animals and birds, whom he fed with his own hand. His biography mentions how he had once confronted two Europeans when they had come down for hunting of birds and had forced them to leave without hunting. There is a legend that he entreated a cobra with his folded hands to leave his backyard and go to the jungles rather than killing it as per the wish of others, and apparently the cobra acquiesced. With reference to these conducts, Nagmahashaya often used to say, "The outside world is the projection of your own mind. As you give out to the world, so you receive back from it. It is just like looking into the mirror. The reflection in the mirror exactly shows what faces you make at it." According to his biography, it was his direct perception that the one God resides in the heart of all creatures. He realized the truth that "All live, move and have their being in Him." If he was questioned why he remained with his palms folded, he replied that he perceived his personal God everywhere and in every being. It became impossible for him even to tear a leaf from a living plant.

His Quotes 
About worship, he used to say - "Lord is verily the Kalpataru - the wish-fulfilling tree. He gives whatever is asked of Him. But man should not indulge in such desires which will drag him again into the rounds of births and deaths. He must pray to the Lord to grant him unflinching devotion to His hallowed feet and a true knowledge of His self. Then only can he break through the sordid bonds of the world and attain freedom through His grace. Hankering after worldly ends must bring in its attendant evils."

About supernatural powers he would say - "When a man becomes pure and truly spiritual, temptations of a subtler kind such as some occult or miraculous power or some sudden attainment of prosperity try to allure him continually. A pure soul has not got to reason out the truth of objects. He intuitively knows everything; for as the pure crystal catches the reflection of all objects about it, the pure mind comprehends the things of the world in their entirety. But should those powers attract his attention, there is every chance of his being led away from the ideal."

Nag Mahasaya who did not have any narrowness with respect to religions or caste, used to say, "In the kingdom of God there is no distinction of caste or creed. All are equal in His eyes. Those who surrender themselves at the feet of the Lord, by whatever name they may call Him, in whatever form they may meditate on Him -- if they can do that with a sincere and devoted heart, they will surely get the grace of the Almighty. The numerous paths or creeds are numerous ways to reach the same kingdom of God. They are all effective, provided one follows them with a sincere heart and a resolute mind."

Death 
Nag Mahasaya died in 1899 in a condition of abject poverty and indebtedness. Sarat Chandra Chakravarty who witnessed his death mentions that even in his deathbed it was his prime concern to serve his guests who came to see him and to talk about Sri Ramakrishna. Swami Saradananda, a leading monk of Ramakrishna Order and a brother disciple who at this time was in Dacca also came to see him. Apparently, Nag Mahasaya also selected the precise date and time of his departure.

The last moments of his life are documented in the book "Life of Nag Mahasaya" by Sarat Chandra Chakravarty.

His last words were, "Grace, grace, grace out of Thine own boundless mercy."

After his death a photograph was taken of his body which is now reproduced in all writings related to him.

Further reading 
 Householder Disciples of Ramakrishna
 Nag Mahashay - Portrait of A Great Man, by Tarapada Acharjee, July 1998, Tama Prokashan

References

External
 Complete Works of Swami Vivekananda
 "The Integral Yoga, Sri Aurobindo's teaching and method of practice" by Sri Aurobindo
 "They Lived with God :Life Stories of some devotees of Sri Ramakrishna" by Swami Chetanananda, chapter 15
 Gospels of Holy Mother, http://saradadevi.info/GHM_book/p-293.html
 Nag Mahashay in vedantauk
 M., the Apostle and the Evangelist, volume 2, by Swami Nityatmananda (Bengali - Sri Ma Darshan)
 ramkrishnavivekananda.info
 "Diary of a Disciple" by Sarat Chandra Chakrabarti
 RKM Nagpur
 Lay Disciples of Sri Ramakrishna

Lay disciples of Ramakrishna
1846 births
1899 deaths